PAF Base Rafiqui, formerly known as PAF Base Shorkot , is a Pakistan Air Force (PAF) airbase located near Shorkot, Jhang District, in the Punjab province of Pakistan. It is around 337 km south of Islamabad. The base is served by a single 10,000-foot runway and a parallel taxiway that could be used for emergency landing and recovery of aircraft.

The base was renamed in honour of Squadron Leader Sarfaraz Ahmed Rafiqui, a highly decorated fighter pilot who led raids into enemy territory during the Indo-Pakistani War of 1965. Rafiqui is famous for assisting his fellow pilots over enemy territory despite being heavily outnumbered even after the guns of his aircraft had jammed.

See also
 List of Pakistan Air Force Bases

References

External links
 Pakistan Aviation

Pakistan Air Force bases
Military installations in Punjab, Pakistan